The 16th Daytime Emmy Awards were held on Thursday, June 29, 1989, on NBC to commemorate excellence in daytime programming from March 6, 1988-March 5, 1989. The awards aired from 3-5 p.m. EST, preempting Santa Barbara. Again this year, the awards ceremony was a joint presentation of the National Academy of Television Arts and Sciences (NATAS) on the East Coast and the Academy of Television Arts and Sciences (ATAS) on the West Coast. The ceremonies and live telecast was held at the Waldorf-Astoria Hotel in New York City. The non-televised Daytime Emmy Awards presentation for programs and individual achievement, primarily for excellence in creative arts categories, was held four days earlier on June 25. The ceremony did not have a formal host, but was announced by Don Pardo.

Winners in each category are in bold. Two winners were recorded in the Outstanding Supporting Actress in a Daytime Drama Series category, as a tie was recorded in the race between actresses Debbi Morgan and Nancy Lee Grahn.

Outstanding Daytime Drama Series
All My Children
As the World Turns
General Hospital
Guiding Light
Santa Barbara
The Young and the Restless

Outstanding Actor in a Daytime Drama Series
David Canary (Adam Chandler and Stuart Chandler, All My Children)
James Mitchell (Palmer Cortlandt, All My Children)
Douglass Watson (Mac Cory, Another World)
Larry Bryggman (Dr. John Dixon, As the World Turns)
A Martinez (Cruz Castillo, Santa Barbara)

Outstanding Actress in a Daytime Drama Series
Susan Lucci (Erica Kane, All My Children)
Elizabeth Hubbard (Lucinda Walsh, As the World Turns)
Marcy Walker (Eden Capwell, Santa Barbara)
Jeanne Cooper (Katherine Chancellor, The Young and the Restless)

Outstanding Supporting Actor in a Daytime Drama Series
David Forsyth (Dr. John Hudson, Another World)
Joseph Campanella (Harper Deveraux, Days of Our Lives)
Justin Deas (Keith Timmons, Santa Barbara)
Quinn Redeker (Brian Romalotti, The Young and the Restless)

Outstanding Supporting Actress in a Daytime Drama Series
Debbi Morgan (Angie Hubbard, All My Children)
Nancy Lee Grahn (Julia Wainwright, Santa Barbara)
Jane Elliot (Anjelica Deveraux, Days of Our Lives)
Arleen Sorkin (Calliope Jones, Days of Our Lives)
Robin Mattson (Gina Blake, Santa Barbara)

Outstanding Young Man in a Daytime Drama Series
Andrew Kavovit (Paul Ryan, As the World Turns)
Darrell Utley (Benjy Hawk, Days of Our Lives)
Justin Gocke (Brandon Capwell, Santa Barbara)

Outstanding Ingenue in a Daytime Drama Series
Anne Heche (Marley Hudson and Vicky Hudson, Another World)
Martha Byrne (Lily Walsh, As the World Turns)
Kimberly McCullough (Robin Scorpio, General Hospital)
Noelle Beck (Patricia Alden, Loving)

Outstanding Daytime Drama Series Writing
 Another World
 Santa Barbara
 As the World Turns
 Guiding Light

Outstanding Daytime Drama Series Directing
 As the World Turns
 The Young and the Restless
 Family Medical Center
 Loving
 One Life to Live

Outstanding Game Show
The $25,000 Pyramid - A Bob Stewart-Sande Stewart Production for CBS (Syn. by 20th Century Fox Television)
Jeopardy! - A production of Merv Griffin Enterprises (Syn. by King World)
The Price Is Right - A Mark Goodson Production for CBS
Wheel of Fortune - A production of Merv Griffin Enterprises for NBC (Syn. by King World)
Win, Lose or Draw - A Kilne & Friends Production for NBC (Syn. by Buena Vista Television)

Outstanding Game Show Host/Hostess
Alex Trebek (Jeopardy!)
Dick Clark (The $25,000 Pyramid)
Pat Sajak (Wheel of Fortune)
Vicki Lawrence Schultz (Win, Lose or Draw)

Outstanding Animated Program
Karl Geurs, Mark Zaslove, Bruce Talkington and Carter Crocker (The New Adventures of Winnie the Pooh)
William Hanna, Joseph Barbera, Tom Ruegger, Ray Patterson, Lane Raichert, Bill Matheny and Laren Bright (A Pup Named Scooby-Doo)
Bob Hathcock, Jymn Magon, Bruce Talkington and Len Uhley (DuckTales)
Margaret Loesch, Jim Henson, Bob Richardson, John Ahern, Karen Peterson, Rudy Cataldi, Al Kouzel, Chuck Downs, Hank Saroyan, Sindy McKay and Larry Swerdlove (Muppet Babies)
William Hanna, Joseph Barbera, Paul Sabella, Ray Patterson, Don Lusk, Paul Sommer, Bob Goe, Carl Urbano, Glenn Leopold, Sean Catherine Derek, Kevin Hopps, Bill Matheny, Reed Robbins and Ernie Contreras (The Smurfs)

Outstanding Film Sound Mixing
Jeffrey J. Haboush and Greg P. Russell (Muppet Babies)

Outstanding Film Sound Editing (Tie)
Al Breitenbach, Ron Fedele, Richard C. Allen, Steven D. Williams and Kenneth R. Burton (Muppet Babies)
Steve Kirklys, Steve Michael, Peter Cole, Ken Dahlinger, Greg Teall and John Walker (Pee-wee's Playhouse)

External links

016
Daytime Emmy Awards